Lawrence Borthwick Kelly Jr.  (5 November 1928 – 11 July 2018) was an Australian politician. He was the Labor member for Corrimal in the New South Wales Legislative Assembly from 1968 to 1988, and served as Speaker from 1976 to 1988.

Kelly was born in Thirroul, the son of Laurie Kelly Sr., who was a member of the Legislative Assembly from 1947 to 1955. He was educated at Thirroul Primary School and Wollongong High School, and after leaving school worked as an accountant. He joined the Labor Party in 1948. On 23 October, 1954, he married Rhonda Ali, with whom he had two children and who preceded him in death.

In 1968, Kelly was selected as the Labor candidate for the seat of Corrimal, largely a successor to his father's old seat of Bulli. Elected easily, he never had difficulty in winning re-election. He was appointed Speaker in 1976, serving until 1988, when his seat of Corrimal was abolished. Kelly challenged sitting Independent MP Frank Arkell for his seat of Wollongong, but was defeated.

Kelly died on 11 July 2018 due to complications of pneumonia that he had contracted earlier in the month.

References

1928 births
2018 deaths
Members of the New South Wales Legislative Assembly
Speakers of the New South Wales Legislative Assembly
Australian Labor Party members of the Parliament of New South Wales
Members of the Order of Australia
Recipients of the Centenary Medal
Australian people of Scottish descent
Deaths from pneumonia in New South Wales